"Can't Bring This Down" is a single recorded by American recording artist Bridgit Mendler, featuring American rapper and musician Pell. The single was released digitally to retailers on March 17, 2017 via Black Box. The single has been described as a smooth R&B song.

Music video 
The visual for "Can't Bring This Down" was directed by Vladimir Sepetov. It contains "soothing, psychedelic visuals". The music video was released on May 12, 2017.

Mendler spoke about the video, saying:

Track listing 
 Digital download
 "Can't Bring This Down" (featuring Pell) – 3:36

 Blended Babies remix
 "Can't Bring This Down (Blended Babies remix)" (featuring Pell) – 3:32

Release history

References 

Bridgit Mendler songs
2017 singles
Songs written by Bridgit Mendler
2017 songs